Jules Tavernier (27 April 1844 – 18 May 1889) was a French painter, illustrator, and an important member of Hawaii’s Volcano School.

Life and career
He was born on 27 April 1844 in Paris.  He studied with the French painter, Félix Joseph Barrias (1822–1907), but left France in the 1870s, never to return. Tavernier was employed as an illustrator by Harper's Magazine, which sent him, along with Paul Frenzeny, on a year-long coast-to-coast sketching tour in 1873. He arrived in San Francisco in the summer of 1874, but soon traveled south and founded an art colony on the Monterey Peninsula. Eventually, he continued westward to Hawaii, where he made a name for himself as a landscape painter. He was fascinated by Hawaii’s erupting volcanoes—a subject that was to pre-occupy him for the rest of his life, which was spent in Hawaii, Canada, and the western United States. Tavernier died on 18 May 1889 in Honolulu, Hawaii.

His students included D. Howard Hitchcock (1861–1943), Amédée Joullin (1862–1917), Charles Rollo Peters (1862–1917) and Manuel Valencia (1856–1935).

Among the public collections holding paintings by Jules Tavernier are the Brigham Young University Museum of Art (Provo, UT), Colorado Springs Fine Arts Center (Colorado Springs, CO), Crocker Art Museum (Sacramento), Gilcrease Museum (Tulsa, OK), Hearst Art Gallery (Saint Mary's College of California, Moraga, CA), Honolulu Museum of Art, Isaacs Art Center (Kamuela, HI), Museum of Nebraska Art (Kearney, NE), Oakland Museum of California, San Diego Museum of Art, Stark Museum of Art (Orange, TX), Society of California Pioneers (San Francisco, CA),  Washington County Museum of Fine Arts (Hagerstown, MD), and Yosemite Museum (Yosemite National Park).

In 2014 the Crocker Art Museum in Sacramento, California held an exhibition of more than 100 works by Tavernier, the first career retrospective of his work, accompanied by a catalog entitled Jules Tavernier: Artist & Adventurer. After the Crocker, the exhibition moved to the Monterey Museum of Art.

Gallery

Footnotes

References
 Chalmers, Claudine, Scott A. Shields, and Alfred C. Harrison Jr., Jules Tavernier: Artist and Adventurer, Crocker Art Museum, Sacramento, California, 2013, 
 Forbes, David W., Encounters with Paradise: Views of Hawaii and its People, 1778-1941, Honolulu Academy of Arts, 1992, 95-209.
 Maier, Steven, Jules Tavernier: Hawaii’s First Real Painter, Honolulu, Nov. 1996, 80.
 McGlynn, Betty Hoag, "Jules Tavernier, 1844-1889" in Tanner, Jerré E., Hawaii Island Artists and Friends of the Arts, premiere ed., Malama Arts Inc., Kailua-Kona, Hawaii, 1989, pp. 13–19

External links

Tigertail Virtual Museum

American landscape painters
19th-century American painters
19th-century American male artists
American male painters
French landscape painters
American portrait painters
French portrait painters
1844 births
1889 deaths
Volcano School painters
Painters from Hawaii
19th-century French painters
French male painters
Artists from San Francisco
Painters from California
Burials at Oahu Cemetery
19th-century French male artists